Arimbra Hills or Mini Ooty is a tourist spot between Malappuram and Kondotty in Malappuram district, Kerala, India. It is at a height of 445 meter above sea level. The place attracts large number of visitors for its rolling hills and scenic views. The location got the nickname as it resembles Ooty, one of the famous hill stations in India. There are many stone crushers and plantations atop the hill. There is an old Harijan Colony on the western side of the hill.

Apart from the Western Ghats, Kerala has five major independent mountains. Of these, three are in Malappuram district, one in Palakkad and one in Kannur. The largest of these five mountains is the Cheriyam mountain at Mankada in Malappuram district. This Cheriyam mountain is also known as Panthalur Hill. Cheriyam mountain is located at an elevation of 613 m(2,011 ft) above sea level. Mount Amminikkadan is the second highest mountain of this five mountains. The height of this Amminikkadan mountain is 540 meters. This Arimbra mountain in Kondotty in Malappuram district is the third highest mountain of this five mountains. The height of this Arimbra mountain is 445 meters.

How to reach

It can be reached by 4 km distance from Aravankara near Pookkottoor located in Malappuram - Calicut stretch of NH966. 11 km from Karathode located in Malappuram-Parappanangadi road (SH 72). There are several other minor roads that connects to the region from Pookotur, Mongam, Morayur,  Musliyarangadi, Kottukara, Thottassery near Kondotty etc. An alternative route is available from Poolappis Junction near Oorakam on SH 72. Those who are coming from Calicut can access the hills from Colony road near Kondotty.

Hiking Spots
Thiruvonamala, Poolappees, Muchikundu, Cheruppadi Mala, Kunnumpuram and Kakkad  are suitable for  hiking and also have fine viewpoints.  You can see the runway of Kozhikode airport in full action from these viewpoints.

History
Actually, Arimbra was a separate  Revenue Village called Amsom at the time of British Raj. When the village head (Adhikari) was suspended by British Authorities due to some allegations against him, the Morayur village head (Adhikari) Kodithodika Valiya Ahammed Kutty Haji was given charge then. Later Arimbra merged to Morayur Revenue Village.

Schools
Government Vocational Higher Secondary School, Arimbra is one of the oldest schools of the area.  A UP School and a Sunni Madrassah are also in the village.  The football ground of the high school is set in the Arimbra Hills.

See also
 Morayur
 Mongam
 Valluvambram Junction
 Arimbra Bapu
 Nediyiruppu

References

Tourist attractions in Malappuram district
Villages in Malappuram district
Kondotty area
Hill stations in Kerala